Listed below are the dates and results for the 1994 FIFA World Cup qualification rounds for the South American zone (CONMEBOL). For an overview of the qualification rounds, see the article 1994 FIFA World Cup qualification.

A total of 9 CONMEBOL teams entered the competition. Chile was banned by FIFA due to the 1989 Maracanazo incident.  The South American zone was allocated 3 direct places and 1 play-off places in the final tournament.

The 9 teams were divided into 2 groups. The teams would play against each other on a home-and-away basis. The number of teams and spots for each group were as follows:
Group A had 4 teams. The group winner would qualify. The runner-up would advance to the CONMEBOL / CONCACAF / OFC Intercontinental Play-off.
Group B had 5 teams. The group winner and runner-up would qualify.

Qualification seeding (CONMEBOL)

Group A

Colombia qualified.  Argentina advanced to the CONMEBOL / CONCACAF / OFC Intercontinental Play-off.

Group B

Brazil and Bolivia qualified.

Inter-confederation play-offs

Qualified teams
The following four teams from CONMEBOL qualified for the final tournament.

1 Bold indicates champions for that year. Italic indicates hosts for that year.

Goalscorers

7 goals

 Luis Ramallo

5 goals

 Erwin Sánchez
 Bebeto
 Freddy Rincón

4 goals

 Ramón Medina Bello
 Marco Etcheverry

3 goals

 Milton Melgar
 Ricardo Gomes
 Raí
 Eduardo Hurtado
 Alfredo Mendoza

2 goals

 Gabriel Batistuta
 Branco
 Palhinha
 Romário
 Faustino Asprilla
 Adolfo Valencia
 Iván Valenciano
 Daniel Fonseca
 Enzo Francescoli
 Fernando Kanapkis
 Ruben Sosa
 Juan Enrique García

1 goal

 Abel Balbo
 Fernando Redondo
 Alvaro Peña
 Luis Cristaldo
 Marco Sandy
 Dunga
 Evair
 Müller
 Alexis Mendoza
 Wilson Pérez
 Cléber Chalá
 Carlos Muñoz
 Raúl Noriega
 Byron Tenorio
 José Luis Chilavert
 Catalino Rivarola
 Estanislao Struway
 Darío Muchotrigo
 Roberto Palacios
 José del Solar
 Jorge Soto
 Gabriel Cedrés
 José Oscar Herrera
 Luis Morales
 Oswaldo Palencia

External links
 1994 FIFA World Cup qualification (CONMEBOL) at FIFA.com

 
CONMEBOL
FIFA World Cup qualification (CONMEBOL)
World